The Charles F. Kettering Prize was a US$250,000 award given by the General Motors Cancer Research Foundation for the most outstanding recent contribution to the diagnosis or treatment of cancer.


History
The award was named in honor of Charles F. Kettering, inventor, former General Motors Director, and pioneer of the General Motors Research Laboratories. It was awarded annually from 1979 to 2005. 

In 2006, due to budget constraints the Alfred P. Sloan Jr. Prize, the Charles F. Kettering prize and the Charles S. Mott Prize, originally each worth $250,000, were consolidated into a single General Motors Cancer Research Award with a combined value of $250,000. The first and only winner of the General Motors Cancer Research Award was Napoleone Ferrara. Since 2006 no more prizes have been awarded.

Medalists

2005 Angela H. Brodie
2004 Robert S. Langer
2003 V. Craig Jordan
2002 Brian J. Druker and Nicholas B. Lydon
2001 David E. Kuhl and Michael E. Phelps
2000 Monroe E. Wall and Mansukh C. Wani
1999 Ronald Levy
1998 H. Rodney Withers
1997 
1996  and Patrick C. Walsh
1995 
1994 Laurent Degos and Zhen-yi Wang
1993  and Bernard Fisher
1992 Lawrence H. Einhorn
1991 Victor Ling
1990 David Cox
1989 
1988 Sam Shapiro and Philip Strax
1987 Basil I. Hirschowitz
1986 Donald Pinkel
1985 Paul C. Lauterbur
1984 Barnett Rosenberg
1983 Emil Frei III and Emil J. Freireich
1982 Howard E. Skipper
1981 E. Donnall Thomas
1980 Elwood V. Jensen
1979 Henry S. Kaplan

See also

 List of biomedical science awards

References

Prize, Kettering
Cancer research awards
American science and technology awards
General Motors